Kula Deivam (or Kuladeivam) may refer to:

 Kuladevata, ancestral tulery deity among a clan in Hindu community
 Kula Deivam (1956 film), a 1956 Tamil film
 Kula Daivam, a 1960 Telugu film
 Kula Deivam (TV series), a Tamil TV series
 Kuladeivam Rajagopal, an Indian actor